The Tirano–Lecco railway is an electrified railway line in Lombardy, Italy.

The first section of the line, between Sondrio and Colico, was opened in 1885. It was completed in 1892–1894 with the section from Colico to Lecco, where it was connected with the rest of the Italian network.

It is single track other than at main stations which have passing loops.

The section from Tirano to Sondrio had a different origin, being opened in 1902 as a private railway by the Società Anonima per le Ferrovie dell'Alta Valtellina (FAV). It was integrated in the state network in 1970.  It was subsequently electrified in 1977.

See also 
 List of railway lines in Italy

References

Bibliography 
 RFI - Fascicolo linea 26

External links 

Railway lines in Lombardy
Railway lines opened in 1902